Karl Friedrich Luts (15 November 1883, Saint Petersburg – 15 January 1942, Usolye, Perm Oblast) was an Estonian oil shale chemist and politician.

Karl Luts was born on 15 November 1883 in St. Petersburg, Russian Empire. He studied at the St. Petersburg's St. John's Church School and in 1896–1899 he studied privately at the Craft School of the Imperial Technical School. In 1898, Karl Luts joined the St. Petersburg Estonian Students' Society where he became a member of the board. In 1905-1912, he studied at the Petersburg Imperial Institute of Technology and the Saint Petersburg Imperial University, which he graduated as a chemist. After graduation, he worked as a drawer at different factories of St Petersburg and as an assistant at the Bekhterev Psychoneurological Institute. He was one of the founders of Estonian high-school in St. Petersburg.

In 1918–1919, Karl Luts was appointed Minister of Education of the Estonian Provisional Government. However, he never took the office because at the same time he was imprisoned in Russia by the Soviet regime.

In 1920, Karl Luts moved to Kohtla-Järve and became the head of the National Laboratory of Oil Shale and the Kohtla oil-shale factory at the State Oil Shale Industry of Estonia.

There is a street in Kohtla-Järve named after Karl Luts.

References

1883 births
1942 deaths
Estonian chemists
Education ministers of Estonia
Oil shale in Estonia
Oil shale researchers
Saint Petersburg State University alumni
Estonian people who died in Soviet detention
People who died in the Gulag
Scientists from Saint Petersburg